365 Days is a 2015 Telugu, romantic family drama film written and directed by Ram Gopal Varma. Produced by D. Venkatesh, with soundtrack by Nag Sri Vatsa, the film stars Nandu and Anaika Soti in lead roles. Upon release, the film received mixed reviews.

Plot
The plot deals with newly wed couple and the problems faced by them.

Cast
 Nandu as Apoorva
 Anaika Soti as Shreya
 Krishnudu
 Posani Krishna Murali
 Satya Krishnan
 Raavi Kondala Rao

Production

Soundtrack

Reception

References

External links

Films directed by Ram Gopal Varma
2015 films
Films set in Hyderabad, India
2010s Telugu-language films
Indian romantic drama films
2015 romantic drama films